Protorhoe is a genus of moths in the family Geometridae.

Species
Protorhoe corollaria (Herrich-Schäffer, 1848)
Protorhoe unicata (Guenée, 1858)

References
Natural History Museum Lepidoptera genus database

External links
Fauna Europaea

Xanthorhoini
Geometridae genera